Randall Ladonald Cobb II (born August 22, 1990) is an American football wide receiver who is a free agent. He played college football at Kentucky, and was selected by the Packers in the second round of the 2011 NFL Draft. He also played one season each for the Dallas Cowboys and Houston Texans.

Early life
Cobb was born to Randall Cobb Sr. and Tina Cobb. Randall Sr. worked at the Denso car parts factory in Maryville, Tennessee and also worked side jobs in the evenings, ranging from installing ceramic tile floors to mowing lawns and plowing snow, with young Randall II helping. Tina, who was a track star in high school, later worked at Denso, where she met Randall Sr.

High school career
Cobb attended Alcoa High School in Alcoa, Tennessee, where he was a letterman in football, basketball, and track. His football team was a four-time State Champion in Class AA and Cobb received a "Mr. Football" trophy from the Tennessee Secondary School Athletic Association. At that time, he played both offense and defense as well as special teams but made his biggest impact as quarterback for the Tornadoes. He was an All-District basketball player as a junior, playing for Micah Marsh.

Cobb was also a track star at Alcoa. He was a four-year member of the track team, competing in sprints along with the 4 × 100 m and 4 × 200 m squads. He finished third in the state meet in the 100-meter dash his senior year, recording a career-best time of 10.75 seconds. He was clocked at 21.89 seconds in the 200-meter dash at age 16. He also helped lead the Alcoa 4 × 100 m relay squad to a second-place finish in the state meet as a junior.

College career
Cobb played college football for the University of Kentucky. During his first year, under head coach Rich Brooks, he was named to the SEC All-Freshmen team at quarterback, playing in 11 games and starting four at quarterback. He accounted for 11 touchdowns as a freshman – two passing, two receiving, and seven rushing.

In his sophomore season, he played mainly wide receiver as well as a significant role in the offense/special teams returning kicks, place kick holding, receiving, and also quarterback in the "Wildcat" formation. He scored 15 touchdowns – four receiving, one returning, and ten rushing during the 2009 season. During the season, he had an eight-game streak of scoring a touchdown.

In his junior season, Cobb had a new head coach in Joker Phillips, who said "He's one of the best leaders I've ever been around." He scored a touchdown on a punt return against Western Kentucky. On October 9, 2010, Cobb scored four touchdowns against undefeated Auburn, tying the Kentucky school record for career touchdowns at 32. He was also the first player to score a rushing, passing, and receiving touchdown in the same game for Kentucky since Shane Boyd in 2003. Overall, in his junior season, he finished with 1,017 receiving yards, seven receiving touchdowns, 424 rushing yards, five rushing touchdowns, 58 passing yards, and three passing touchdowns. After his junior season, he declared for the NFL Draft.

While at Kentucky, Cobb majored in community communications and leadership development.

Collegiate statistics

Professional career

Green Bay Packers

The Green Bay Packers selected Cobb in the second round (64th overall) of the 2011 NFL Draft. Cobb was the seventh wide receiver drafted in 2011.

2011 season
On July 29, 2011, the Green Bay Packers signed Cobb to a four-year, $3.20 million contract that included $1 million guaranteed and a signing bonus of $834,124.

On September 8, 2011, in the Packers' opening game of the season against the New Orleans Saints, Cobb became the first person born in the 1990s to play in the NFL. Cobb recorded his first NFL touchdown on a 32-yard reception in the first quarter, and followed up with a 108-yard kickoff return in the third quarter that tied the record set by Ellis Hobbs of the New England Patriots in 2007 for longest kickoff return in NFL history. The return was later named Play of the Year at the season-ending NFL Honors banquet.

In a Monday Night Football game against the Minnesota Vikings on November 14, Cobb scored his second special teams touchdown of the year on an 80-yard punt return in the first quarter. With that, Cobb became the first rookie in Packers history to return both a kick and a punt for a touchdown in the same season. For the season, he caught 25 passes for 375 yards (a 15.0 average) and one touchdown. His most impressive statistics were on special teams, as he returned 34 kicks for 941 yards (a 27.7 average) and one touchdown and 26 punt returns for 295 yards (an 11.3 average) and one touchdown.

Cobb made his playoff debut in the Divisional Round against the New York Giants. He had three receptions for 38 yards in the 37–20 loss.

2012 season
In Week 6, against the Houston Texans, Cobb had seven receptions for 102 yards for his first career 100-yard game in the 42–24 victory. In the 2012 season, Cobb played in 15 games including eight starts. He led the team in receptions with 80 and receiving yards with 954 and was second on the team with eight touchdowns. He set a single-season franchise record with 2,342 combined net yards—954 receiving, 132 rushing, 964 on kickoff returns (a 25.4 average), and 292 on punt returns (a 9.4 average) including one touchdown. He led the NFL in that category. He was named a Pro Bowl first alternate as a kick returner.

2013 season
In 2013, Cobb was limited to six games (including four starts) due to a broken fibula injury suffered in Week 6 against the Baltimore Ravens. He returned to play in the regular season finale against the Chicago Bears at Soldier Field. He caught a memorable 48-yard game-winning touchdown pass from Aaron Rodgers late in the fourth quarter to win the NFC North title for the Packers. He finished with 31 receptions for 433 receiving yards and four receiving touchdowns.

2014 season
In Week 4, Cobb had seven receptions for 113 yards and two touchdowns in a 38–17 victory over the Chicago Bears. In Week 7, against the Carolina Panthers, he had six receptions for 121 yards and one touchdown in the 38–17 victory. In the following game, against the New Orleans Saints, he had five receptions for 126 yards and one touchdown in the 44–23 loss. In Week 11, he had season-highs with 10 receptions and 129 receiving yards against the Philadelphia Eagles. In Week 16, against the Tampa Bay Buccaneers, he had 11 receptions for 131 yards in the 20–3 victory. On January 19, Cobb was named as a replacement for Dez Bryant in the Pro Bowl.

Cobb finished the season with 91 receptions on 126 targets for 1,287 yards and 12 touchdowns. He had a six-game touchdown streak and had five games going over 100 yards on the year. The Packers finished with a 12–4 record and earned a first-round bye as the 2-seed in the NFC. In the Divisional Round, against the Dallas Cowboys, he had eight receptions for 116 yards in the 26–21 victory. In the NFC Championship against the Seattle Seahawks, he had seven receptions for 62 yards and a touchdown in the 28–22 overtime loss. He was ranked as the 100th best player in the NFL by his fellow players on the NFL Top 100 Players of 2014.

2015 season
On March 7, 2015, the Green Bay Packers signed Cobb to a four-year, $40 million contract with a signing bonus of $13 million. After signing the deal, Cobb explained his thought process.  "At the end of the day, my heart was in Green Bay, and I knew that's where I wanted to be. I knew I had a good thing going for me, and still I signed a pretty lucrative deal that I can handle as far as making that last for the rest of my life." Cobb also mentioned that the NFC Championship loss to the Seattle Seahawks still bothered him. "Obviously, that loss still hurts. It still feels fresh. I want to win a championship, and we were right there. We were close. We didn't do what we needed to do to win, but we have a lot of the guys coming back this year, same guys. A lot of our core guys, and we believe that puts us in the mix. So we have to handle business this offseason as far as continuing to get better on a daily basis. Obviously, next season, we have to put ourselves in position to go on a run."

In 2015, Cobb had one of his best seasons as teammate Jordy Nelson went down with an ACL in the preseason. In Week 2, against the Seattle Seahawks, he had eight receptions for 116 yards in the 27–17 victory. In the following game, Cobb had three receiving touchdowns in the 38–28 victory over the Kansas City Chiefs. In Week 13, during the "Miracle in Motown" win, Cobb recovered a James Starks fumble to give the Packers their first touchdown of the game to make the score 20–7 in favor of the Detroit Lions. The Packers would win 27–23 after a Rodgers to Rodgers Hail Mary.

Cobb finished the season with 79 receptions on a career-high 129 targets for 829 yards and six touchdowns. In the Wild Card Round against Washington, Cobb scored a receiving touchdown in the 35–18 victory.

2016 season
On September 16, 2016, Cobb was fined $9,115 for pulling the face mask of linebacker Paul Posluszny in Week 1 against the Jacksonville Jaguars. Cobb finished the season with 60 receptions on 84 targets for 610 yards and four touchdowns. In the Wild Card Round against the New York Giants, Cobb had five receptions for 116 yards and three touchdowns, including catching a 42-yard Hail Mary from Aaron Rodgers at the end of the second quarter.

2017 season
In the 2017 season, Cobb finished with 66 receptions for 653 yards and four touchdowns despite losing starting quarterback Aaron Rodgers. For the first time in his professional career, the Packers finished with a 7–9 record and did not make the playoffs.

2018 season
On September 9, 2018, Cobb caught nine passes for 142 yards and a touchdown in the season-opener against the Chicago Bears. He recorded a career-long 75-yard touchdown reception late in the fourth quarter to give the Packers the go-ahead score in the 24–23 victory. This game marked his 15th career game with at least 100 receiving yards. After two games with four receptions each, Cobb suffered a hamstring injury and missed the next five weeks, appearing for limited duty in Week 8 and Week 9 (for a total of nine receptions). Overall, he finished the 2018 season with 38 receptions for 383 receiving yards and two receiving touchdowns.

Dallas Cowboys
On March 19, 2019, the Dallas Cowboys signed Cobb to a one-year, $5 million contract that includes a signing bonus of $2 million, to be the team's slot wide receiver. Cobb caught his first touchdown with the Cowboys in the first week of the 2019 season with 9:48 left in the third quarter in their home opener against the New York Giants. Cobb finished the game with four catches for 69 yards and a touchdown in the 35–17 win.

In Week 10 against the Minnesota Vikings on Sunday Night Football, Cobb caught six passes for 106 yards and a touchdown in the 28–24 loss. During Week 11 against the Detroit Lions, Cobb finished with four receptions for 115 receiving yards and a touchdown as the Cowboys won 35–27. Overall, Cobb finished the 2019 season with 55 receptions for 828 receiving yards and three receiving touchdowns.

Houston Texans
On April 1, 2020, the Houston Texans signed Cobb to a three-year, $27 million contract that included $18 million guaranteed and a signing bonus of $6 million. He was brought in to be the team's slot wide receiver and help the team offset the loss of DeAndre Hopkins.

In Week 3 against the Pittsburgh Steelers, Cobb caught four passes for 95 yards and his first touchdown reception as a Texan during the 28–21 loss. In Week 7 against his former team, the Green Bay Packers, Cobb recorded eight catches for 95 yards during the 35–20 loss. He was placed on injured reserve on November 25, 2020, after suffering a toe injury in Week 11. Cobb finished the 2020 season with 38 receptions for 441 receiving yards and three receiving touchdowns.

Green Bay Packers (second stint)
On July 28, 2021, the Green Bay Packers traded for Cobb at the request of his close friend and former teammate, quarterback Aaron Rodgers. Houston traded the rights to Cobb – and most of his salary obligations – to the Packers in exchange for a sixth-round draft pick. He sustained an injury on a touchdown catch during a Week 12 win over the Los Angeles Rams, and was deemed questionable to return to the game. He was placed on injured reserve on December 11. Head coach Matt LaFleur announced on January 19 that he had been cleared to return for the Packers' Divisional Round playoff game against the San Francisco 49ers where they lost on a last second field goal. Cobb finished the 2021 season with 28 receptions for 375 receiving yards and five receiving touchdowns.

On October 22, 2022, Cobb was placed on injured reserve after suffering an ankle injury in Week 6. On November 17, 2022, Cobb was activated from injured reserve.

NFL career statistics

Regular season

Postseason

References

External links

Green Bay Packers bio
Kentucky Wildcats football bio

1990 births
Living people
African-American players of American football
Players of American football from Tennessee
People from Maryville, Tennessee
American football quarterbacks
American football return specialists
American football running backs
American football wide receivers
Dallas Cowboys players
Kentucky Wildcats football players
Green Bay Packers players
Houston Texans players
Unconferenced Pro Bowl players
21st-century African-American sportspeople